The Ferrari SF71H was a Formula One racing car designed and constructed by Scuderia Ferrari to compete during the 2018 FIA Formula One World Championship. The chassis was designed by Mattia Binotto, Simone Resta, Enrico Cardile and David Sanchez with Corrado Iotti leading the powertrain design. The car was driven by Sebastian Vettel and Kimi Räikkönen, and made its competitive debut at the 2018 Australian Grand Prix.

Keeping with his tradition to name his cars, Vettel named his SF71H "Loria".

Livery 
As Santander dropped their sponsorship, the livery features very little white, similar to the livery used in the 2007, 2008, and 2009 cars. At the Japanese Grand Prix, Ferrari introduced a new livery, carrying the logo of Mission Winnow, a joint promotion with major sponsor Philip Morris International.

Design and development
The SF71H features a longer wheelbase than its predecessor, the SF70H, and a revised cooling system. Ferrari have further evolved their philosophy of moving the crash structure outside the sidepods, creating a complex bargeboard array and sidepod inlet configuration, even including winglets on the rear view mirrors. A small shark fin goes down the engine cover, and supports a low T-wing above the exhaust and spanning almost the entire width of the rear wing.
One of the most significant updates of the season came at the Spanish Grand Prix, where Ferrari changed the way the mirrors were mounted, switching from a "standard" position to having them mounted on the Halo. They also added a winglet above each mirror, but the FIA deemed them illegal, despite claims from the team that they were intended to support the mirrors. Therefore, they were removed at the next race in Monaco.
After being outperformed by Mercedes at the Singapore, Russian and Japanese Grands Prix, Ferrari removed some of their updates at the United States Grand Prix, which allowed them to compete with and beat Mercedes again.

Racing history 
The  SF71H took two wins in the three opening Grands Prix, and set two new track records at the Bahrain International Circuit and the Shanghai International Circuit while qualifying on pole. Thus in these three races the car seemed to be faster than their rivals Mercedes AMG F1 W09 EQ Power+. As of the end of the 2021 championship, the SF71H is Ferrari's most successful car in the hybrid engine era (2014–present), scoring 6 wins (5 by Vettel, 1 by Räikkönen) and 24 podiums, surpassing its predecessor, the SF70H, that had 5 wins and 20 podiums.

Legacy 

Until the 2020 Belgian Grand Prix, the SF71H driven by Sebastian Vettel held the fastest overall lap record at Circuit de Spa-Francorchamps beating that of Neel Jani in the Porsche 919 Evo. The car that beat the SF71H's record is the Mercedes F1 W11.

Complete Formula One results
(key) (results in bold indicate pole position; results in italics indicate fastest lap)

References

SF71H
2018 Formula One season cars